Disclosure is an English electronic music duo consisting of brothers Howard (born 11 May 1994) and Guy Lawrence (born 25 May 1991). They grew up in Reigate, Surrey. Their debut studio album, Settle, released on 3 June 2013, by PMR Records, was nominated for Best Dance/Electronica Album at the 2014 Grammy Awards. They released a second studio album, Caracal, on 25 September 2015 which was also nominated for Best Dance/Electronic Album at the 2016 Grammy Awards. Their third studio album, Energy, was released on 28 August 2020, and was nominated for Best Dance/Electronic Album at the 2021 Grammy Awards, alongside the fourth single from the album, "My High", which was nominated for Best Dance Recording.

Early life
Disclosure were born to professional musician parents. Their father played in rock bands, including 'No Angry Man' and 'The Look Book' alongside his brother and Guy's godfather, and is now a professional auctioneer, whilst their mother, a session musician, fronted bands, toured on cruises, sang advert jingles, and was one of the first performers to entertain the British Army after their recapture of the Falkland Islands. Guy started playing the drums at the age of three, and Howard started playing the bass at the age of eight. Both also learned to play the guitar and the piano and Howard to sing.

They both attended Reigate College. During this period, the boys studied music and music technology. By the age of 15, Howard listened mainly to funk, soul and maudlin singers, whilst Guy listened predominantly to hip hop, dubstep and was the drummer in an indie-style guitar band with school friends.

Career
Whilst Guy was attending Reigate College, he enjoyed studying classical music, especially the likes of Bach and Claude Debussy. A teenage interest in the music and production techniques of Detroit-based rapper and record producer J Dilla, led him through hip hop to attending dubstep gigs as a student; but he enjoyed house music more as a creation, and began studying it and introducing his brother to it. Primarily influenced by artists including Joy Orbison, James Blake, Burial and Mount Kimbie, the brothers were led back in time to Chicago house, Detroit techno, UK garage and 2-step garage.

2010–2011: Debut
The brothers started de-constructing and copying the music that Guy had heard at gigs in a room above their father's auction house, and then making music in the same room in a style they refer to as "electronic house music with a pop structure", uploading it to Myspace. This got them an early record deal, and a UK tour, mixing live music gigs with occasional DJ sets, where in Manchester, they played a set before Todd Edwards, and gained after gig all-night conversation.

The duo's first single, "Offline Dexterity" was released on 29 August 2010. They signed to the new PMR record label on its formation in January 2011, and released their second single, "Carnival"/"I Love...That You Know" on 13 June 2011. This got them a management deal with Sam Evitt and Jack Street's Method Management whom they are still managed by.

2012–2014: Commercial success and Settle
Disclosure picked up their first significant national radio support upon the release of the "Tenderly" / "Flow" single in January 2012. The single led to significant interest in the subsequent June 2012 EP, The Face, released on Greco-Roman. The EP included the popular remix of "Running" by Jessie Ware a fellow PMR artist which charted in both the Netherlands and Belgium, as well as becoming a fixture of the 2012 Festival Circuit and featuring on the annual edition of Annie Mac presents.

Through collaboration with other artists signed to Method Management, the group had their first UK hit in October 2012 with "Latch", co-written with Jimmy Napes and featuring the vocals from Sam Smith, which peaked at number 11 in the UK Singles Chart.

The group maintained their momentum into 2013 – they were voted into the BBC Radio 1xtra 'Hot Ten For 2013' and scored two consecutive top 10 hit singles in "White Noise" (number two) (with AlunaGeorge) and "You & Me" (number 10) (with Eliza Doolittle). These three singles were collected on an EP, The Singles. They released their debut studio album, Settle, by PMR Records on 3 June 2013 and was met with commercial and critical success, debuting at number one on the UK Albums Chart, charting in many countries across Europe and Australia, and receiving four stars from The Guardian and a 9.1 score on Pitchfork. They performed twice at Glastonbury Festival 2013 and appeared on Later... with Jools Holland. The album was nominated for a Grammy Award for Best Dance Album.

In 2013, Disclosure embarked on a worldwide tour of more than 40 European, American, and Canadian cities, including high-profile music festivals such as the Coachella Valley Music and Arts Festival, Lollapalooza Music Festival in Chicago, and Sasquatch! Music Festival in Washington State. The same year, they established the record label Method Records; its roster includes Friend Within, Karen Harding, Lxury, and Tourist. A sub label was introduced in February 2015, called Method White, releasing more underground tracks through it. The first release was "Wolfsbane" by Jonas Rathsman. Since then, M. J. Cole and Eats Everything have released tracks through the label. Disclosure's song "When a Fire Starts to Burn" was used in the sixth episode of the first season of The 100.

2015–2018: Caracal and hiatus
Following the worldwide success of their debut studio album, Settle and a worldwide tour, the duo began working on their second studio album, Caracal, featuring vocals from Sam Smith, Lorde, Gregory Porter, Lion Babe, Kwabs, The Weeknd, Nao, Miguel, Jordan Rakei and Brendan Reilly. The week of its release, Caracal earned the group their second consecutive number one album in the UK Albums Chart.

The music videos for official singles from the album published on YouTube are interconnected and follow a story line, each newly released video furthering the plot. The videos follow a young woman in a sci-fi, dystopian world who is, for some unknown reason, being chased by the police.

Three singles were released prior to the album: "Omen", "Holding On" and "Jaded". Two promotional singles were also released: "Willing and Able" and "Hourglass". The album was released on 25 September 2015, by PMR Records and Island Records. The album was also nominated for Best Dance/Electronica Album at the 2016 Grammy Awards.

In February 2017, the duo announced they were to take a year's hiatus with the exception of "a few special things", including performances with BBC Radio 1 in Ibiza and the return of their festival Wildlife that summer.

2018–present: Energy 
In January 2018, the duo confirmed that they were in the process of recording their third studio album set for release in early 2020, with a single due in between late 2019 and early 2020. After a hiatus, Disclosure released a song in May 2018 called "Ultimatum" featuring Fatoumata Diawara. In August 2018, five new songs were released over a daily basis: "Moonlight", "Where Angels Fear to Tread", "Love Can Be So Hard", "Funky Sensation" and "Where You Come From". In October 2019 Disclosure performed at the Trafalgar Square leg of Extinction Rebellion’s “International Rebellion” protest. The singles, furthermore, announced their comeback into the studio and revealed that they had started to write and produce new material, which would eventually form their third studio album. On February 24, 2020, they released a new track titled "Ecstasy", followed by four tracks released on a daily basis: "Tondo", "Expressing What Matters", "Etran" and "Get Close". An EP titled Ecstasy, which contained the five tracks, was released on February 28. On the album's release date, Disclosure will have a special Minecraft server for The Energy Minecraft Experience. The music video ''My High'' featuring Aminé and Slowthai was nominated for Best Editor at the Berlin Music Video Awards 2021. The editor of this music videos is Yorgos Lamprinos.

Discography

Settle (2013)
Caracal (2015)
Energy (2020)

Awards and nominations

Berlin Music Video Awards

The Berlin Music Video Awards is an international festival and a networking event that puts the talents working behind the camera in the spotlight. The festival was founded in 2013 by a producer Aviel Silook. The event is filled with music video marathons, workshops, live performances and since 2016 also a fashion show. The Berlin Music Video Awards offers 14 different categories for the applicants and the winners of each category then compete for the Best Music Video.
{| class="wikitable" style="width:85%;"
|-
! width=5%|Year
! style="width:40%;"| Category
! style="width:40%;"| Nominated work
! style="width:10%;"| Result
!width=5%|
|-
|2014
| Best Director
| "When a Fire Starts to Burn"
| 
|
|-
| 2021
| Best Editor
| "My High" (with Aminé & Slowthai)
| 
| 

Brit Awards
{| class="wikitable" style="width:85%;"
|-
! width=5%|Year
! style="width:40%;"| Category
! style="width:40%;"| Nominated work
! style="width:10%;"| Result
!width=5%|
|-
| rowspan="4" | 2014
| Best British Breakthrough Act
| rowspan="2" | Disclosure
| 
| rowspan="4"|
|-
| British Group
| 
|-
| British Album of the Year
| Settle
| 
|-
| British Single of the Year
| "White Noise" (featuring AlunaGeorge)
| 

Camerimage
{| class="wikitable" style="width:85%;"
|-
! width=5%|Year
! style="width:40%;"| Category
! style="width:40%;"| Nominated work
! style="width:10%;"| Result
!width=5%|
|-
|2014
| Best Music Video
|"Grab Her!"
| 
|

European Border Breakers Awards
{| class="wikitable" style="width:85%;"
|-
! width=5%|Year
! style="width:40%;"| Category
! style="width:40%;"| Nominated work
! style="width:10%;"| Result
!width=5%|
|-
| 2014
| Album of the Year (UK)
| Settle
| 

European Festival Awards
{| class="wikitable" style="width:85%;"
|-
! width=5%|Year
! style="width:40%;"| Category
! style="width:40%;"| Nominated work
! style="width:10%;"| Result
!width=5%|
|-
| 2017
| Remixer of the Year
| Disclosure
| 
|

Grammy Awards
{| class="wikitable" style="width:85%;"
|-
! width=5%|Year
! style="width:40%;"| Category
! style="width:40%;"| Nominated work
! style="width:10%;"| Result
!width=5%|
|-
| 2014
| Best Dance/Electronica Album
| Settle
| 
| 
|-
| 2015
| Best Dance Recording
| "F for You" (featuring Mary J. Blige)
| 
| 
|-
| 2016
| Best Dance/Electronica Album
| Caracal
| 
| 
|-
| 2019
| Best Dance Recording
| "Ultimatum" 
| 
| 
|-
| 2020
| Record of the Year
| "Talk" 
| 
| 
|-
| rowspan="2"|2021
| Best Dance/Electronica Album
| Energy
| 
| rowspan="2"|
|-
| Best Dance Recording
| "My High" 
| 
|-

International Dance Music Awards
{| class="wikitable" style="width:85%;"
|-
! width=5%|Year
! style="width:40%;"| Category
! style="width:40%;"| Nominated work
! style="width:10%;"| Result
!width=5%|
|-
| 2013
| Best Breakthrough Artist (Group)
| Disclosure
| 
|-
| rowspan="4" | 2014
| Best Full Length Studio Recording
| Settle
| 
|-
| Best House/Garage/Deep House Track
| rowspan="3" | "Latch" (featuring Sam Smith)
| 
|-
| Best Music Video
| 
|-
| rowspan="2" | Best Featured Vocalist Performance
| 
|-
| rowspan="2" | 2015
| rowspan="2" | "F for You" (featuring Mary J. Blige)
| 
|-
| rowspan="2" | Best House/Garage/Deep House Track
| 
|-
| rowspan="5" | 2016
| rowspan="3" | "Holding On" (featuring Gregory Porter)
| 
|-
| Best Featured Vocalist Performance
| 
|-
| Best Music Video
| 
|-
| Best Artist (Group)
| Disclosure
| 
|-
| Best Full Length Studio Recording
| Caracal
| 

Ivor Novello Awards
{| class="wikitable" style="width:85%;"
|-
! width=5%|Year
! style="width:40%;"| Category
! style="width:40%;"| Nominated work
! style="width:10%;"| Result
!width=5%|
|-
| 2014
| Most Performed Work
| "Latch" (featuring Sam Smith)
| 
|

Libera Awards

MOBO Awards
{| class="wikitable" style="width:85%;"
|-
! width=5%|Year
! style="width:40%;"| Category
! style="width:40%;"| Nominated work
! style="width:10%;"| Result
!width=5%|
|-
| rowspan=3|2013
| Best Male Act 
| Disclosure
| 
|-
| Best Album
| Settle
| 
|-
| Best Song
| "White Noise" (featuring AlunaGeorge)
|  

MTV Video Music Awards Japan
{| class="wikitable" style="width:85%;"
|-
! width=5%|Year
! style="width:40%;"| Category
! style="width:40%;"| Nominated work
! style="width:10%;"| Result
!width=5%|
|-
| 2014
| rowspan="2" | Best Dance Video
| "F for You" (featuring Mary J. Blige)
| 
|-
| 2016
| "Magnets" (featuring Lorde)
| 

MTVU Woodie Awards
{| class="wikitable" style="width:85%;"
|-
! width=5%|Year
! style="width:40%;"| Category
! style="width:40%;"| Nominated work
! style="width:10%;"| Result
!width=5%|
|-
| 2014
| Best Video Woodie
| "Grab Her"
| 
| 

NME Awards
{| class="wikitable" style="width:85%;"
|-
! width=5%|Year
! style="width:40%;"| Category
! style="width:40%;"| Nominated work
! style="width:10%;"| Result
!width=5%|
|-
| rowspan="2" | 2015
| Best British Band
| Themselves
| 
| rowspan="2"|
|-
| Best Track
| "White Noise" (featuring AlunaGeorge)
| 

Popjustice £20 Music Prize
{| class="wikitable" style="width:85%;"
|-
! width=5%|Year
! style="width:40%;"| Category
! style="width:40%;"| Nominated work
! style="width:10%;"| Result
!width=5%|
|-
| 2013
| Best British Pop Single
| "White Noise" (featuring AlunaGeorge)
| 
| 

Rober Awards Music Poll
{| class="wikitable" style="width:85%;"
|-
! width=5%|Year
! style="width:40%;"| Category
! style="width:40%;"| Nominated work
! style="width:10%;"| Result
!width=5%|
|-
| rowspan=2|2013
| Breakthrough Artist
| Themselves
| 
|-
| Best Dance Anthem
| "When a Fire Starts to Burn"
| 

UK Festival Awards
{| class="wikitable" style="width:85%;"
|-
! width=5%|Year
! style="width:40%;"| Category
! style="width:40%;"| Nominated work
! style="width:10%;"| Result
!width=5%|
|-
| 2013
| Anthem of the Summer
| "White Noise" (featuring AlunaGeorge)
| 

UK Music Video Awards
{| class="wikitable" style="width:85%;"
|-
! width=5%|Year
! style="width:40%;"| Category
! style="width:40%;"| Nominated work
! style="width:10%;"| Result
!width=5%|
|-
| 2012
| Best Dance Video – Budget
| "Control" (featuring Ria Ritchie)
| 
| 
|-
| rowspan="3" | 2014
| Best Visual Effects
| rowspan="2" | "Grab Her"
| 
| rowspan="3"|
|-
| Best Dance Video – UK
| 
|-
| Best Music AD
| Settle
| 
|-
| 2016
| Best Dance Video – UK
| "Magnets" (featuring Lorde)
| 
| 
|-
| rowspan=3|2020
| Best Editing in a Video
| rowspan=2|"My High" (with Aminé & Slowthai)
| 
| rowspan="3"|
|-
| rowspan=2|Best Dance/Electronic Video - UK
|  
|-
| "Energy"
| 
|-
| rowspan=2|2021
| Best R&B/Soul Video - UK
| rowspan=2|"Birthday"
| 
| rowspan="2"|
|-
| Best Production Design in a Video
| 

World Music Awards
{| class="wikitable" style="width:85%;"
|-
! width=5%|Year
! style="width:40%;"| Category
! style="width:40%;"| Nominated work
! style="width:10%;"| Result
!width=5%|
|-
| rowspan=4|2014
| World's Best Live Act
| Themselves
| 
|-
| rowspan=2|World's Best Song
| "White Noise" (featuring AlunaGeorge)
| 
|-
| rowspan=2|"You & Me"
| 
|-
| World's Best Video
|

References

External links
 Official website

People from Reigate
Musical groups from Surrey
Sibling musical duos
Musical groups established in 2010
Future garage musicians
UK garage duos
Electronic dance music duos
English house music duos
Island Records artists
Interscope Records artists
NME Awards winners
Moshi Moshi Records artists
Deep house musicians
2010 establishments in England